A royal bastard was a common term (now largely dropped from common usage) for the child of a reigning monarch who was considered to have been born outside of marriage - either because the monarch had an extra-marital affair, or because the legitimacy of the monarch's marriage had been called into question.

Notable royal bastards include Robert, Earl of Gloucester, son of King Henry I of England, Henry FitzRoy, son of King Henry VIII of England, and the Duke of Monmouth, son of Charles II. The Anglo-Norman surname Fitzroy means son of a king and was used by various illegitimate royal offspring, and by others who claimed to be such. In medieval England a bastard's coat of arms was marked with a bend/baton sinister.

Notable fictional instances include the legendary character Mordred, who was often portrayed as King Arthur's villainous "illegitimate" son. Some fictional portrayals of royal bastards were less negative, such as the character of Philip the Bastard (also known as of Cognac) in Shakespeare's King John.

Ancient Rome
Unlike medieval royalty, the Romans were more concerned with continuity of family name than with bloodline. If a man recognized a child as his, this was accepted by law, and the issue of who the biological father was did not arise. If a child was not recognized, he or she could be exposed or brought up as a slave. For example, Emperor Claudius initially accepted a girl as his daughter, but later rejected her and had her exposed. Emperors often adopted their successors. There are no recorded examples of aristocrats in classical times accusing other aristocrats of being illegitimate, as was common in later periods.

Caesarion was possibly the illegitimate son of Julius Caesar by Cleopatra, which would also make him Caesar's only known child besides Julia.

Belgium 
A book published in February 2011 claimed that Albert II of Belgium has an illegitimate half-sister named Ingeborg Verdun, the daughter of King Leopold III and Austrian-Belgian ice skater Liselotte Landbeck.

In October 2020, the bastard daughter of Albert II of Belgium was legally acknowledged after DNA testing to be titled Princess Delphine of Belgium by the Belgian Court of Appeal. Ms Delphine Boël intends to change her surname to her father's Saxe-Coburg.

Flanders and Brabant 
Older illegitimate children founded important family branches, as reported in the Trophées de Brabant: tome 1():
 House of Witthem, legitimised son of John II, Duke of Brabant.
 House of Brant, legitimised son of John III, Duke of Brabant.
 House of Glymes, legitimised son of John II, Duke of Brabant.
 House of Nassau-Corroy, legitimised son of Henry III of Nassau-Breda
 House of Dongelberghe, legitimised son of John I, Duke of Brabant.
 House of Mechelen, legitimised son of John I, Duke of Brabant.

England, Scotland, Great Britain and the United Kingdom

English kings

Papal legates decree in 786

In the Anglo-Saxon Heptarchy then Kingdom, descendants of kings were called aethelings, whether legitimate or not. When a kingship became vacant, a Witan would meet to name an aetheling as king. Papal legates visited the great hall of Offa of Mercia in 786 and decreed that an English king "must not be begotten in adultery or incest" and that "he who was not born of a legitimate marriage" could not succeed to the throne. It is likely no rule of succession had set as to bastardy before this decree.

Anglo-Saxon kings
Two Anglo-Saxon kings of England had sons who faced opposition to their succession seemingly based on the status of their mother. Leading figures in the kingdom refused to accept the succession of Æthelstan, eldest son of Edward the Elder. Some medieval chroniclers writing centuries later describe his mother, Ecgwynn, as a concubine or of low social status, while others portray her as a noble wife, and some modern historians have attributed the challenge to his succession as related to questions of the status of his mother. Edward the Martyr, eldest son of Edgar the Peaceful, likewise faced opposition due to the nature of his birth. A contemporary charter calls the king's later spouse his 'lawful wife' and seems to afford her son, Edmund, a higher status than his elder half-brother, Edward. Later chroniclers are contradictory, one making Edward an illegitimate child born to a nun, another calling his mother a noblewoman wed to his father. Scholarly opinion is divided whether Edward was born to an extramarital liaison or simply bore lesser status because his mother had not been consecrated as queen, unlike the powerful Ælfthryth, mother of his younger half-brothers.

Stephen
Gervase de Blois (written variously, often in latest books Gervais of Blois), a bastard of Stephen I, was Abbot of Westminster from 1138 to  1157. Stephen had two other bastards from the same mother – Ralph and Americ of Blois.

Henry I
Henry I had about two dozen recognized illegitimate children, including Robert, 1st Earl of Gloucester, Sybilla of Normandy (wife of King Alexander I of Scotland), Maud FitzRoy (wife of Conan III, Duke of Brittany), Constance or Maud FitzRoy, Mabel FitzRoy, Alice FitzRoy, Gilbert FitzRoy, and Emma. "It might be permissible to wonder how it was that Henry I managed to keep track of all his illegitimate children, but there is no doubt that he did so," wrote historian Given-Wilson.

Henry II
Henry II had several bastards, most notably Geoffrey, Archbishop of York and William Longespée, 3rd Earl of Salisbury (who inherited his earldom from his wife's father, William of Salisbury). William's mother was Ida de Tosny, while Geoffrey's may have been called Ykenai.

Richard I
Richard the Lionheart had at least one illegitimate child: Philip of Cognac, who died young (possibly in battle). He features as Philip the Bastard in Shakespeare's King John.

John
John had at least five children with mistresses during his first marriage to Isabelle of Gloucester, and two of which are known to have been noblewomen. He had eight or more others including Jeanne/Joan, Lady of Wales (wife of Llywelyn the Great) and Richard FitzRoy.

Edward IV of England
Edward IV had at least five illegitimate children, including Arthur Plantagenet, 1st Viscount Lisle (later Lord Deputy of Calais) by his mistress Elizabeth Lucy.

Perkin Warbeck closely resembled Edward IV and claimed to be his son Richard of Shrewsbury; it has been theorised that Perkin was one of Edward's illegitimate children.

Richard III justified his accession to the throne by claiming that the children of Edward IV were the product of an invalid marriage.

Richard III
Richard III had at least two illegitimate children: John of Gloucester (Captain of Calais for a time) and Katherine, second wife of William Herbert, 2nd Earl of Pembroke.

Henry VII
Sir Roland de Velville was, in one account, the illegitimate son of Henry VII and "a Breton lady."

Henry VIII

Henry VIII had one acknowledged illegitimate child, Henry FitzRoy, 1st Duke of Richmond and Somerset. As he had many mistresses, historians put forward six other likely instances including the mercenary Thomas Stukley, the poet Richard Edwardes and two of Mary Boleyn's children.

His daughter Elizabeth was in then Catholic canon law illegitimate, as Henry had married her mother, Anne Boleyn having divorced Queen Catherine; it was lawful under his new Anglican legal system.

Scottish kings
Máel Coluim mac Alaxandair (fl. 1124–1134) was an illegitimate son of Alexander I of Scotland (r. 1107–1124) who unsuccessfully claimed his throne.

William the Lion (r. 1165–1214) had at least 6 illegitimate children, including Isabella Mac William.

Alexander II's (r. 1214–1249) illegitimate daughter Marjorie married Alan Durward.

Robert the Bruce (r. 1306–1329) had possibly six illegitimate children, including Robert Bruce, Lord of Liddesdale.

Robert II (r. 1371–1390) had 13+ illegitimate children, including Thomas Stewart, later Bishop of St Andrews.

Robert III (r. 1390–1406) at least two illegitimate children, including John, ancestor of the Shaw Stewart baronets.

James II (r. 1437–1460) had an illegitimate son, John Stewart, Lord of Sticks (d. 1523).

James IV (r. 1488–1513) had at least 5 illegitimate children with his mistresses, including Alexander Stewart, Archbishop of St Andrews, James Stewart, 1st Earl of Moray and Lady Janet Stewart, la Belle Écossaise.

James V (r. 1513–1542) had at least 9 illegitimate children with his mistresses, including Lady Jean Stewart (by Elizabeth Bethune), Robert Stewart, 1st Earl of Orkney (by Euphemia Elphinstone) and James Stewart, 1st Earl of Moray (by Margaret Erskine).

Kings of Great Britain

Charles II
Charles II fathered at least 20 illegitimate children, of whom he acknowledged 14. The most famous of these was James Scott, 1st Duke of Monmouth, his son by Lucy Walter. After Charles' death, Monmouth led a rebellion against his uncle James II. Charles had no legitimate children who survived childhood.

When Nell Gwynn brought her first child to Charles, she told it, "Come hither you little Bastard and speak to your father!". Charles responded, "Nay, Nellie, do not call the child such a name", to which Gwynn replied "Your Majesty has given me no other name by which I may call him." Charles then named the child "Beauclerk" and bestowed the title "Earl of Burford".

Illegitimate children of Charles II
By Lucy Walter (c.1630–1658):
 James Scott, 1st Duke of Monmouth (1649–1685), found and executed nine days after skirmish of his forces' Battle of Sedgemoor. 

By Elizabeth Boyle, Viscountess Shannon (1622–1680):
 Charlotte FitzRoy, Countess of Yarmouth (1650–1684), 
By Catherine Pegge
 Charles FitzCharles, 1st Earl of Plymouth (1657–1680), known as "Don Carlo", created Earl of Plymouth (1675)
 Catherine FitzCharles (born 1658; she either died young or became a nun at Dunkirk)
By Barbara Palmer, 1st Duchess of Cleveland (1641–1709)
 Anne Lennard, Countess of Sussex (1661–1722). She may have been the daughter of Roger Palmer, but Charles accepted her.
 Charles FitzRoy, 2nd Duke of Cleveland (1662–1730).
 Henry FitzRoy, 1st Duke of Grafton (1663–1690). Ancestor of the Dukes of Grafton.
 Charlotte Lee, Countess of Lichfield (1664–1717).
 George FitzRoy, 1st Duke of Northumberland (1665–1716).
 Lady Barbara FitzRoy (1672–1737). She was probably the child of the Duke of Marlborough. She was never acknowledged by Charles.

By Nell Gwyn (1650–1687):
 Charles Beauclerk, 1st Duke of St Albans (1670–1726)
 James, Lord Beauclerk (1671–1680)
By Louise de Kérouaille, Duchess of Portsmouth (1649–1734)
 Charles Lennox, 1st Duke of Richmond and Lennox (1672–1723). Ancestor of the Dukes of Richmond and Lennox.

By Moll Davis, courtesan and actress of repute:
 Lady Mary Tudor (1673–1726)

James II and VII
James II and VII had 13 illegitimate children.

George I
George I had 3 illegitimate children by his mistress, Melusine von der Schulenburg, Duchess of Kendal, including Melusina von der Schulenburg, Countess of Walsingham.

Monarchs of the United Kingdom

William IV
William IV had 11 illegitimate children. They used the surname "FitzClarence", because he was duke of Clarence.

Queen Victoria
When Victoria became queen, she banned royal bastards from court as "ghosts best forgotten." Since then, the issue has been shrouded in secrecy and any subsequent illegitimate children have gone unacknowledged.

Edward VII

Edward VII was claimed to be the natural father of the model Olga de Meyer.

France 
Anthony, bastard of Burgundy was the illegitimate son of Philip the Good of Burgundy. He was known as le grand bâtard (the great bastard). He was legitimized by King Charles VIII in 1485.

Henri IV
Henri IV had many mistresses and illegitimate children. The children of Gabrielle d'Estrées are notable because the King may have signed a wedding agreement with their mother before her unexpected death in 1599.

 By Gabrielle d'Estrées
 César, Duke of Vendôme, legitimized
 Catherine Henriette, mademoiselle de Vendôme, legitimized
 Alexandre, Chevalier de Vendôme, legitimized
 By Madame de Verneuil
 Gaston Henri, Duke of Verneuil, legitimized
 Gabrielle Angélique, mademoiselle de Verneuil, legitimized
 By Madame de Moret
 Antoine, Count of Moret, legitimized
 By Charlotte des Essarts
 Jeanne Baptiste, legitimized
 Marie Henriette, legitimized

Louis XIV
Louis XIV had many mistresses and illegitimate children. Madame de Maintenon was their governess.

"The bastards", as they were called, were compared to mules, unnatural hybrids who should not reproduce. "No issue should come of such species," the king once said. Louis, nonetheless, found appropriate spouses for his illegitimate children.

As illegitimate children were considered impure, their mothers might attempt to purify them through pious behavior. Louise de La Vallière had six children by Louis XIV, including Marie Anne de Bourbon (1666–1739) and Louis de Bourbon (1667–1683). She repented by joining a Carmelite convent. There she wore a belt of iron spikes that cut into her flesh.

Church leaders denounced Madame de Montespan, Louis' best-known mistress, who had seven children by him. In 1675, Father Lécuyer refused to give her absolution. "Is this the Madame that scandalises all France?" he asked. "Go abandon your shocking life and then come throw yourself at the feet of the ministers of Jesus Christ."

The king's efforts to legitimize his illegitimate children showed his, "Olympian disdain for public opinion," according to one modern author. The edict of Marly, issued in July 1714, granted two of Louis' sons by Montespan the right to succeed to the French throne. This hugely unpopular decision led to a political crisis called the "bastard distortion" in 1714–1715. It was reversed by the Parliament of Paris in July 1717, after Louis had died.

 By Mademoiselle de La Vallière
 Charles de La Baume Le Blanc
 Marie Anne, mademoiselle de Blois, legitimized and married in the royal family
 Louis, Count of Vermandois, legitimized
 By Madame de Montespan
 Louis Auguste, Duke of Maine, legitimized and made dynast (1714-1715).
 Louis César, Count of Vexin, legitimized
 Louise Françoise, mademoiselle de Nantes, legitimized and married in the royal family
 Louise Anne, mademoiselle de Tours, legitimized
 Françoise Marie, mademoiselle de Blois, legitimized and married in the royal family
 Louis Alexandre, Count of Toulouse, legitimized and made dynast (1714-1715)
 By Mademoiselle des Œillets
 Louise de Maisonblanche

Louis XV
Like his great-grandfather, Louis XV had many mistresses and illegitimate children, but contrary to him, he never legitimized any of them.

 By Pauline Félicité de Mailly
 Charles Emmanuel Marie Magdelon de Vintimille du Luc
By Jeanne Perray:
Amélie Florimond de Norville
By Marie-Louise O'Murphy
Agathe Louise de Saint-Antoine de Saint-André
Marguerite Victoire Le Normant de Flaghac.
 By Françoise de Chalus
 Philippe Louis Marie Innocent Christophe Juste de Narbonne-Lara
 Louis Marie Jacques Amalric de Narbonne-Lara
By Marguerite Catherine Haynault
Agnès Louise de Montreuil
Anne Louise de La Réale
By Lucie Madeleine d'Estaing
Agnès Lucie Auguste
Aphrodite Lucie Auguste
By Anne Coppier de Romans 
 Louis Aimé de Bourbon, called the Abbot of Bourbon; he was the only one of the illegitimate children of Louis XV who was officially recognized. 
 By Jeanne Louise Tiercelin de La Colleterie
 Benoît Louis Le Duc

Monaco 
Prince Albert II of Monaco has two illegitimate children, Jazmin Grace Grimaldi and Alexandre Grimaldi-Coste.

Portugal 
King Peter I of Portugal had an illegitimate son, John, who became Grand Master of the Order of Avis, and following the childless death of his legitimate half-brother, King Ferdinand I of Portugal and the ensuing 1383–1385 Portuguese interregnum, he succeeded as King John I, founding the House of Avis that would rule Portugal for the next two centuries. John I had an illegitimate son, Afonso, who was named Duke of Braganza by his half-brother, the regent Peter, Duke of Coimbra. He thus founded the House of Braganza that in 1640 would successfully claim the Portuguese crown on the basis of this descent, and rule into the 20th century.

King Carlos I of Portugal allegedly had an illegitimate daughter who became one of the most famous and controversial royal bastards in the history of European royalty: Maria Pia of Saxe-Coburg and Braganza.

Spain 
In 783, Mauregatus of Asturias, the illegitimate son of King Alfonso I of Asturias born to a moorish slave, took the throne upon the death of his brother-in-law Silo of Asturias, reigning for about 5 years.

The will of Sancho III of Pamplona, who died in 1035, lands in the County of Aragon were left to his illegitimate son Ramiro, who would grow these holdings into the Kingdom of Aragon, and whose son Sancho Ramírez, became King of Pamplona. Ramiro's illegitimate son, also named Sancho Ramírez, was made Count of Ribagorza. King García Sánchez III of Pamplona, had an illegitimate son Sancho Garcés, and when King Alfonso the Battler died in 1134, grandsons of royal bastards Sancho Ramírez of Ribagorza and Sancho Garcés of Uncastillo were among the candidates for succession, with the latter being successful, becoming King García Ramírez of Navarre.

Alfonso VI, King of León and Castile, had a complex family born to multiple wives and mistresses, but only one son, Sancho, born to a fugitive Muslim mistress, Zaida of Seville. Sancho was named his father's heir in 1107, but was killed following a battle the next year. Alfonso's legitimate daughter Queen Urraca of León succeeded, but her rule in Portugal was challenged by her illegitimate half-sister, Theresa, Countess of Portugal, whose ambitions for independence were realized by her son, Afonso I of Portugal. Urraca herself, as queen regnant, would have two recognized bastard children by nobleman Pedro González de Lara, her main supporter against her former husband Alfonso the Battler.

In the 14th century, the English-allied King Peter of Castile would be overthrown by an alienated nobility in favor of his illegitimate half-brother, Henry of Trastámara, who thus became king as Henry II of Castile and was ancestor of the later royal family.

In the 16th Century John of Austria (Spanish: Juan de Austria) was an illegitimate son of Holy Roman Emperor Charles V. In his last will of 1558, the Emperor officially recognized Juan as his son and put him to the service of his legitimate successor Philip II. He devoted his life to the service of his half-brother, King Philip II of Spain, and is best known for his role as the admiral of the Holy Alliance fleet at the Battle of Lepanto.

In 2003, Leandro Ruiz Moragas, an illegitimate son of King Alfonso XIII's, gained the right to call himself a prince.

See also
 Colonial American bastardy laws
 Concubinage
 Consort
 Droit du seigneur
 Issue (genealogy)
 Legitimacy (family law)
 Primogeniture
 Royal descent
 Royal mistress

References

Further reading
Roger Powell and Peter Beauclerk, Royal Bastards: Illegitimate Children of the British Royal Family (2008)
Chris Given-Wilson and Alice Curteis, The Royal Bastards of Medieval England (1995)
Peter Beauclerk-Dewar and Roger Powell Right Royal Bastards: The Fruits of Passion (2007)
Anthony J. Camp, Royal Mistresses and Bastards Fact and Fiction 1714–1936 (2007)

Legitimacy law